Glucuronosyl-N-acetylgalactosaminyl-proteoglycan 4-beta-N-acetylgalactosaminyltransferase (N-acetylgalactosaminyltransferase II, UDP-N-acetyl-D-galactosamine:D-glucuronyl-N-acetyl-1,3-beta-D-galactosaminylproteoglycan beta-1,4-N-acetylgalactosaminyltransferase, chondroitin synthase, glucuronyl-N-acetylgalactosaminylproteoglycan beta-1,4-N-acetylgalactosaminyltransferase, uridine diphosphoacetylgalactosamine-chondroitin acetylgalactosaminyltransferase II) is an enzyme with systematic name UDP-N-acetyl-D-galactosamine:beta-D-glucuronosyl-(1->3)-N-acetyl-beta-D-galactosaminyl-proteoglycan 4-beta-N-acetylgalactosaminyltransferase. This enzyme catalyses the following chemical reaction

 UDP-N-acetyl-D-galactosamine + beta-D-glucuronosyl-(1->3)-N-acetyl-beta-D-galactosaminyl-proteoglycan  UDP + N-acetyl-beta-D-galactosaminyl-(1->4)-beta-D-glucuronosyl-(1->3)-N-acetyl-beta-D-galactosaminyl-proteoglycan

This enzyme is involved in the biosynthesis of chondroitin sulfate.

References

External links 
 

EC 2.4.1